Shah mostan jidul haque khijir is a Bangladesh Nationalist Party politician and the former Member of Parliament of Tangail-7.

Career
Mia was elected to parliament from Tangail-7 as a Bangladesh Nationalist Party candidate in 1979.

References

Bangladesh Nationalist Party politicians
Living people
2nd Jatiya Sangsad members
Year of birth missing (living people)